The 1950 Paris–Roubaix was the 48th edition of the Paris–Roubaix, a classic one-day cycle race in France. The single day event was held on 9 April 1950 and stretched  from Paris to the finish at Roubaix Velodrome. The winner was Fausto Coppi from Italy.

Results

References

1950 Paris-Roubaix
1950 in road cycling
1950 in French sport
1950 Challenge Desgrange-Colombo
April 1950 sports events in Europe